Michael Streiter (born 19 January 1966 in Hall in Tirol) is a retired Austrian footballer.

Club career
A rather short sweeper, Streiter made his professional debut at 17 years of age with FC Wacker Innsbruck in the 1983/1984 season. He stayed in Innsbruck for 14 years, also playing for FC Swarovski Tirol and FC Tirol Innsbruck. In 1997, he moved to Vienna giants FK Austria Wien.

International career
He made his debut for Austria in August 1989 against Iceland and was a participant at the 1990 FIFA World Cup. He earned 34 caps, scoring one goal. His final international game was a September 1999 European Championship qualification match against Spain.

International goal
Scores and results list Austria's goal tally first.

Coaching career

He was trainer at SV Horn in the season 2012–13.

Streiter became head coach of Wacker Innsbruck on 27 December 2013.

Honours
Austrian Football Bundesliga (2):
 1989, 1990
Austrian Cup (2):
 1989, 1993

References

External links
 Player profile - Austria Archive
 

1966 births
Living people
People from Innsbruck-Land District
Austrian footballers
Austria international footballers
1990 FIFA World Cup players
FC Wacker Innsbruck players
FK Austria Wien players
Austrian Football Bundesliga players
Austrian football managers
Association football defenders
SV Horn managers
Footballers from Tyrol (state)
WSG Tirol managers
FC Wacker Innsbruck (2002) managers
WSG Tirol players
FC Tirol Innsbruck players
FC Swarovski Tirol players